Heather Scheuber (born 20 January 1988) is an English footballer who played for Birmingham City Ladies Football Club in the FA WSL.

Club career
In summer 2004 a 16-year-old Scheuber signed for Birmingham City from Tranmere Rovers. She was confirmed as a member of Birmingham City's FA WSL squad in December 2010.

International career
Scheuber represented England at U-17 and U-19 level. In 2007, she fell into dispute with national team bosses after perceiving that her commitment had been questioned.

Scheuber was left out of the squad for the 2007 UEFA Women's Under-19 Championship in Iceland, and later indicated a willingness to switch her international allegiance to Wales.

Coaching career
Since 2008, Scheuber has been the manager of Boughton Athletic FC, a local men's football team who play in Chester and District Division Three.

References

1988 births
Living people
English women's footballers
Birmingham City W.F.C. players
Tranmere Rovers L.F.C. players
FA Women's National League players
Women's Super League players
Women's association football midfielders